Cribrarula astaryi f. lefaiti is a species of sea snail, a marine gastropod mollusk in the family Cypraeidae.

Description
Original description: "The shell has all the characteristics of the genus Cribrarula. It can be distinguished particularly by the large black marginal notches and by the solid, heavy ventral part, pure porcellaneous white. This is naturally in comparison with the other species of the genus. Its unique feature is the denticles of the fossula, which point strongly towards the inside of the shell."

Distribution
Locus typicus: "Nuku Hiva, Archipelago of the Marquesas, French Polynesia."

References

Cypraeidae